Muddahanumegowda S. P. (born 4 March 1954) is an Indian former advocate, former Judicial Officer and Member of Parliament in 16th Lok Sabha. He belongs to the Indian National Congress party.

Early life and background 
Muddahanumegowda was born to Karigowda alias Papegowda and Sharadamma on 8 June 1954 in Sobaganahalli, Tumkur District, Karnataka. He completed his B.A. and LL.B education from J.S.S. College, Mysore and S.J.R. College of Law, Bangalore.

Personal life 
S. P. Muddahanumegowda married Kalpana on 29 May 1997 and the couple has one son and two daughters.

Political career 
In the 2014 Indian General Election, he defeated the sitting Bharatiya Janata Party candidate G.S. Basavaraj by 74,041 votes and became a member of the 16th Lok Sabha representing Tumkur in Karnataka. He has previously worked as a judge for a few years and later as a member of the legislative assembly for ten years from Kunigal constituency in Karnataka.

On 2 September 2022, he resigned from Indian National Congress and Joined Bharatiya Janata Party, Karnataka in presence of Chief Minister of Karnataka Basavaraj Bommai, On 3 November 2022.

Position held

References

Living people
India MPs 2014–2019
People from Tumkur district
Lok Sabha members from Karnataka
Indian National Congress politicians from Karnataka
1954 births
Bharatiya Janata Party politicians
Bharatiya Janata Party politicians from Karnataka